Cesare Pronti (November 30, 1626 – October 22, 1708) was an Italian painter of the Baroque period, active mainly near Ravenna.

Biography
He was born at Cattolica, near Rimini, and was brought up at Bologna, training in that city under Guercino. He then helped complete the quadrature for the Villa Albizzi in Bologna, working with Carlo Cignani. He then moved to Ravenna, where Pronti helped decorate with a mix of quadratura and allegorical figures representing four Continents in the Rasponi family's palace, Palazzo di San Giacomo, near Russi. He also helped decorate, with oculi with flying putti, the former church of San Romualdo, now a museum in Classe (in the Biblioteca Classense), and formerly a Camaldolese Abbey. In Ravenna, he was commonly called Padre Cesare da Ravenna. He became an Augustinian monk as a young man, and was afterwards principally engaged in painting altarpieces for the churches of his fraternity, of which one of the best is an altarpiece depicting St Thomas of Villanova for Sant'Agostino, Pesaro. He died at Ravenna.

References

Bibliography
Cesare Pronti da Cattolica (1626-1708), Un omaggio in quattro atti, a cura di Alessandro Giovanardi, saggi di Ivana Balducci, Annamaria Bernucci, Maurizio Castelvetro, Massimo Pulini, Pazzini Editori, Rimini, 2021, 

1626 births
1708 deaths
People from Rimini
17th-century Italian painters
Italian male painters
18th-century Italian painters
Italian Baroque painters
Painters from Bologna
18th-century Italian male artists